Live at the Boarding House is an album recorded by the 1973–1974 bluegrass group, Old & In the Way. It is a complete recording of a concert held October 08, 1973, at the Boarding House in San Francisco.  It was released in 2008.

Track listing 
Disc 1 
 "Home is Where the Heart Is"
 "Love Please Come Home"
 "Down Where The River Bends"
 "Kissimee Kid"
 "Pig in a Pen"
 "Uncle Pen"
 "Panama Red"
 "Midnight Moonlight"
 "White Dove"
 "Wild Horses"
 "Orange Blossom Special"
 "Old and in the Way"
 "Lonesome Fiddle Blues"

Disc 2
 "On and On"
 "Land of the Navajo"
 "Catfish John"
 "Til the End of the World Rolls 'Round"
 "Drifting Too Far from the Shore"
 "I'm Knocking On Your Door"
 "Old and in the Way Breakdown"
 "You'll Find Her Name Written There"
 "Jerry's Breakdown"
 "The Great Pretender"
 "Working on a Building"
 "High Lonesome Sound"
 "Wicked Path Of Sin"
 "Blue Mule"

Personnel
Old & In The Way
Jerry Garcia - banjo, vocals
David Grisman - mandolin, vocals
Peter Rowan - guitar, vocals
Vassar Clements - fiddle
John Kahn - bass
Technical
Craig Miller - executive producer
Owsley Stanley III - recording

Chart performance

Notes

References 

Rolling Stone. 
Nugs.net. https://web.archive.org/web/20110723230743/http://www.nugs.net/prodDet.aspx?productType=0&productID=19142
Rhapsody. https://web.archive.org/web/20110510015159/http://www.rhapsody.com/old-in-the-way/live-at-the-boarding-house

Old & In the Way live albums
Jerry Garcia live albums
2008 live albums